Robert McDowell may refer to:
R. B. McDowell (Robert Brendan McDowell, 1913–2011), Irish historian
Robert H. McDowell  (1894—1980), American historian and intelligence officer 
Robert M. McDowell (born 1963), American politician
Robert McDowell (poet), American poet, founder of Poets' Prize, editor of The Reaper magazine
Zenith (comics) (published 1987–1992), British comic superhero whose full name is Robert Neal Cassady McDowell
Robert McDowell (artist) (born 1952), artist, economist, banker, founder of Summerhall, Edinburgh

See also
Robert McDowall (1821–1894), cricketer
Bob McDowall (1939 – 2011), ichthyologist
Robert McDowell McCracken (1874–1934), American politician from Idaho
Robert McDouall (1774–1848), Scottish-born officer in the British Army